Pipiza luteitarsis is a species of Hoverfly, from the family Syrphidae, in the order Diptera.

Description
External images For terms see Morphology of Diptera

Wing length 6·5–8 mm. Front tarsa yellow. See references for determination.

Distribution
Palearctic Fennoscandia South to Belgium and France. Ireland eastwards through Central Europe into European Russia.

Biology
Habitat: Fagus (Beech) and Quercus (Oak) woodland also in mature suburban gardens. Flowers visited include Euphorbia, Prunus, Ranunculus, Tussilago. Flies mid April to end May. Pipiza larvae are predators of gall-forming aphids.

References

Diptera of Europe
Pipizinae
Insects described in 1843
Taxa named by Johan Wilhelm Zetterstedt